Maple City may refer to:

 Maple City, Kansas
 Maple City, Michigan